A contact sport is a sport in which bodily contact is necessary. The amount of physical contact implicated varies by sport, meaning "contact" is a relative descriptor. A foul in basketball, football, and boxing all look different, but since physical contact is a major component of each game, they all qualify as contact sports.

Some contact sports have non-contact variations (such as flag football for American football) which replace tackling and other forms of contact with alternative methods of interacting with an opponent, such as removing a flag from a belt worn by the opponent. Other sports may have contact, but such events are illegal under the rules of the game and are incidental or accidental and do not form part of the sport.

It can also include impact via a piece of sporting equipment, such as being struck by a hockey stick or football.

Non-contact sports are those where participants should have no possible means of touching, such as sprinting, swimming, darts or snooker, where players use separate lanes or take turns of play. Consideration should also be given to other sports such as motocross, BMX, and road cycling, which all involve riding/racing in packs of riders. This often results in brushing and bumping off other riders.

In contact sports, not only is contact acceptable, it is encouraged in some aspects of the game (Picks, Boxing out, creating offensive space). There is a limit as to how much contact is acceptable, and a foul is called when that border is crossed. However, to say basketball isn't a contact sport would be inaccurate.

Nomenclature

United States of America
Current medical terminology in the United States uses the term collision sport to refer to sports like rugby, American football, ice hockey, lacrosse and roller derby. The term contact sport is used to refer to sports such as basketball and handball, and the term limited-contact sport to sports like baseball, volleyball and squash.

The American Academy of Pediatrics policy statement was revised in 2008 included the following definitions:

Injuries
Many sports will penalize contact with rules for certain situations or instances to help reduce the incidence of physical trauma or litigation for assault or grievous bodily harm.
Many sports involve a degree of player-to-player or player-to-object contact. The term "contact sport" is used in both team sports and combat activities, medical terminology and television game shows, such as American Gladiators and Wipeout, to certain degrees. Contact between players is often classed by different grades ranging from non-contact, where there is no contact between players, to full-contact or collision sports, where the rules allow for significant physical contact.

Equipment

As a result of the risk of injury, some sports require the use of protective equipment, for example American football protective equipment or the gloves and helmets needed for underwater hockey. Some sports are also played on soft ground and have padding on physical obstacles, such as goal posts.

Most contact sports require any male players to wear an Abdominal Guard to protect their male genitalia.

The cost of equipment can be an obstacle to participating in many sports.

Grades

Full-contact

A (full) contact sport is any sport for which significant physical impact force on players, either deliberate or incidental, is allowed or within the rules of the game.

Contact actions include tackling and blocking and a whole range of other moves that can differ substantially in their rules and degree of application.

Examples of full-contact sports include American football, Canadian football, Australian rules football, rugby union, rugby league, rugby sevens, ice hockey, lacrosse, hurling, arena football, underwater football, water polo, slamball, roller derby, kabaddi, quidditch, shinty and wheelchair rugby.

Full-contact martial arts include Boxing, Mixed martial arts, Sambo, Sumo, Wrestling, Muay Thai, Brazilian jiu-jitsu, Judo, Sanshou, Historical European Martial Arts, Lethwei, Taekkyon, Vovinam, Pradal serey, Savate, various forms of full contact karate, and some forms of Taekwondo

Semi-contact
A semi-contact sport is typically a combat sport involving striking and containing physical contact between the combatants simulating full-power techniques. The techniques are restricted to limited power, and rendering the opponent unconscious is forbidden.

Some semi-contact sports use a point system to determine the winner and use extensive protective gear to protect the athletes from injury. Examples of semi-contact sports include karate, kickboxing, kalaripayattu, Kenpo, various Korean martial arts that incorporate contact rules sparring, kendo, some types of historical European martial arts, fencing and taekwondo.

Another indicator of a semi-contact martial arts competition system is that after a point is rewarded the adversaries will be separated and resume the match from safe distance, but often it is possible to argue if some martial arts sports belong in one contact group or another.

Tagging-only 

In some sports, the only or main type of physical contact allowed is tagging (touching an opponent lightly, usually with a hand).

Limited-contact

Limited-contact sports, or sports which involve, "incidental" contact, are sports for which 

For instance, "Basketball, by rule, is a non-contact sport." However, there is a great deal of contact in basketball, which referees tolerate at their discretion until it negatively affects the game. Players are usually not permitted to bump or knock a player down in basketball (with some exceptions such as bumping an opponent with your forearm in the paint on defense, and offensive players are allowed to back down defenders), as opposed to full-contact sports like rugby where it is perfectly legal to knock a player off the ball, or even to the ground in several ways. Excessive contact will result in penalties which provide a tactical advantage to the team which endured the foul play, or temporarily or permanently dismissing the offending player(s) from the match.

Examples of limited-contact sports

Non-contact
Non-contact sports are sports where participants compete alternately in lanes or are physically separated such as to make it nearly impossible for them to make contact during the course of a game without committing an out-of-bounds offense or, more likely, disqualification. Examples of non-contact sports include cricket, tennis, table tennis, badminton, golf, bowling, bowls, croquet, pool, snooker, bossaball, darts, curling, tug of war, bodybuilding, swimming, diving, gymnastics, sprinting, running, track and field, bicycle race, rowing, archery, freestyle football, footgolf, fistball, tchoukball and sepak takraw.

Sports injury prevention

There has been an increasing medical, academic, and media focus on sports involving rapid contact in the late 20th to early 21st century and their relationship with sports injuries. Several sports governing bodies began changing their rules in order to decrease the incidence of serious injuries and avoid lawsuits. In some countries, new laws have been passed, particularly in regards to concussions.

Concussions

United States of America
At the professional level, America's professional football league, the National Football League, began banning concussed players from re-entering the same game in which they were injured in order to reduce the risk of further injury and damage.

Canada
In Canada in 2018, Rowan's Law was passed after the death of a young Canadian female athlete. Rowan Stringer died in 2013 of Second Impact Syndrome, "...the result of suffering multiple concussions playing rugby three times in six days."

See also
 Combat sport

References

Sports terminology